Thorne Colliery Football Club is a football club based in Moorends, Doncaster, South Yorkshire, England.

History
Little is known of the formation of the club, but Thorne first came to the limelight in 1927, then they reached the 3rd Qualifying Round of the FA Cup in their debut campaign in the competition. Five years later they joined the Yorkshire League, finishing as high as 4th in the pre-World War II years.

They re-joined the Yorkshire League after the war and finished as runners-up in 1946. A year they went one better, being crowned as league champions. They were relegated to Division Two in 1950 but won promotion back to the top flight four years later. Their stay in Division One would only last another year before being relegated again, but their yo-yo status continued when they were promoted back again in 1956. Following another relegation in 1958, Thorne wouldn't get back to Division One again until 1966.

After another relegation in 1970, the club embarked on a decade of tough times which saw them relegated again to Division Three in 1974, remaining in the basement division for five years. Between 1978 and 1982 they went through a remarkable period where they won back-to-back promotions to reach Division One, before then going through back-to-back relegations to find themselves back in Division Three.

Their last relegation came at the wrong time, as the Yorkshire League merged with the Midland League to form the Northern Counties East League (NCEL), with Thorne being placed in Division Two North of the new competition. They only remained in the NCEL for five years before resigning and joining the Doncaster & District Senior League. They won the Doncaster League in all five years they stayed in the competition, before joining the Central Midlands League (CMFL) in 1993.

They won promotion to the top flight of the CMFL in 1995 but spent only three seasons in the Supreme Division before being relegated back to the Premier Division, remaining at that level until 2011, when they were placed in the North Division of the newly restructured CMFL.

Season-by-season record

Notable former players
Players that have played in the Football League either before or after playing for Thorne Colliery:
  Bobby Browne
  James Fullwood
  Bob Johnson
  Ted Sagar

Ground
The club plays at the Welfare Ground, on Grange Road, Moorends, postcode DN8 4NA.

Honours

League
Yorkshire League
Champions: 1946–47
Yorkshire League Division Two
Promoted: 1953–54, 1955–56, 1965–66, 1978–79
Yorkshire League Division Three
Promoted: 1977–78
Central Midlands League Premier Division
Promoted: 1994–95
Doncaster & District Senior League Premier Division
Champions: 1988–89, 1989–90, 1990–91, 1991–92, 1992–93

Cup
Goole & Thorne FA Cup
Winners: 2010–11, 2013–14

Records
Best FA Cup performance: 3rd Qualifying Round, 1927–28

References

External links
Official website

Football clubs in England
Football clubs in South Yorkshire
Sport in the Metropolitan Borough of Doncaster
Thorne, South Yorkshire
1929 establishments in England
Doncaster & District Senior League
Yorkshire Football League
Northern Counties East Football League
Central Midlands Football League
Association football clubs established in 1929
Mining association football teams in England